The Eurovision Song Contest 1965 was the tenth edition of the annual Eurovision Song Contest. Organised by the European Broadcasting Union (EBU) and host broadcaster Radiotelevisione Italiana (RAI), the contest was held at Sala di Concerto della RAI on 20 March 1965, and was hosted by Italian singer Renata Mauro.

Eighteen countries participated in the contest - setting a new record for the highest number of entrants in the competition until that point.  returned after being absent from the previous edition, while  made its debut.

Luxembourg won for the second time with the highly controversial "Poupée de cire, poupée de son" sung by the French singer France Gall, and written by Serge Gainsbourg, which later went on to be a massive hit in almost all European countries.

Location 

The contest took place in Naples, the capital of region Campania in southern Italy and the third-largest city in Italy, after Rome and Milan. This was Italy's first hosting of the Eurovision Song Contest. The host venue was the then new Sala di Concerto della RAI (RAI Production Centre of Naples), founded few years prior to the contest, in the late fifties and early sixties. It is located in Viale Marconi in the district of Fuorigrotta. The structure has three TV studios for a total of 1227 m2 and capacity of 370 persons, used for the filming of programs and fiction and an auditorium. The Neapolitan song archives are also housed in it.

Format 
Each country had 10 jury members who distributed three points among their one, two, or three favourite songs. The points were totalled and the first, second, and third placed songs were awarded 5, 3, and 1 votes in order. If only one song got every point within the jury it would get all 9 points. If only two songs were chosen, the songs would get 6 and 3 points in order.

Ingvar Wixell, the Swedish participant performed his song in English instead of the original Swedish title "Annorstädes vals". The native languages were used for all of the other participants. This led to a rule being introduced for the next 1966 edition, that meant all participants had to perform their songs using one of their national languages.

Participating countries 

18 countries took part, with the Eurovision Song Contest reaching its highest number until then. Sweden returned after a one-year absence, and Ireland entered for the first time. Ireland would later become the most successful country in the competition, scoring seven wins in total.

Returning artists

Conductors 
Each performance had a conductor who led the orchestra.

 Dolf van der Linden
 Eric Robinson
 Adolfo Ventas Rodríguez
 Gianni Ferrio
 
 Gianni Ferrio
 Øivind Bergh
 
 Raymond Bernard
 
 Franck Pourcel
 
 Gianni Ferrio
 Arne Lamberth
 Alain Goraguer
 George de Godzinsky
 Radivoje Spasić
 Mario Robbiani

Participants and results

Detailed voting results 

Each country had 10 jury members who distributed three points among their one, two, or three favourite songs. The points were totalled and the first, second, and third placed songs were awarded 5, 3, and 1 votes in order. If only one song got every point within the jury it would get all 9 points. If only two songs were chosen, the songs would get 6 and 3 points in order.

5 points 
Below is a summary of all 5 points in the final:

Spokespersons 

Listed below is the order in which votes were cast during the 1965 contest along with the spokesperson who was responsible for announcing the votes for their respective country.

 Dick van Bommel
 Alastair Burnet
 
 Frank Hall
 
 
 
 Ward Bogaert
 TBC
 
 
 Maria Manuela Furtado
 Enzo Tortora
 Claus Toksvig
 TBC
 
 Ljubo Jelčić

Broadcasts 

Each participating broadcaster was required to relay the contest via its networks. Non-participating EBU member broadcasters were also able to relay the contest as "passive participants". Broadcasters were able to send commentators to provide coverage of the contest in their own native language and to relay information about the artists and songs to their television viewers.

Known details on the broadcasts in each country, including the specific broadcasting stations and commentators are shown in the tables below. In addition to the participating countries, the contest was also reportedly broadcast in Czechoslovakia, East Germany, Hungary, Poland, Romania and the Soviet Union via Intervision.

Notes

References

External links 

 
1965
Music festivals in Italy
1965 in music
1965 in Italy
Music in Naples
March 1965 events in Europe
Events in Naples
20th century in Naples